The Erfurt massacre was a school shooting that occurred on 26 April 2002 at the Gutenberg-Gymnasium, a secondary school in Erfurt, Germany. 19-year-old expelled student Robert Steinhäuser shot and killed 16 people, including 13 staff members, 2 students, and 1 police officer before committing suicide. One person was also wounded by a bullet fragment. According to students, he ignored them and aimed only for the teachers and administrators, although 2 students were unintentionally killed by shots fired through a locked door.

Background
Robert Steinhäuser (22 January 1983 – 26 April 2002) was a student of the Gutenberg Gymnasium until early October 2001. At the end of September 2001, he had spent a few days away from school, for which he presented a mandatory medical certificate which was quickly identified as a forgery. Because of this forgery, Steinhäuser was expelled by the principal.

The investigation revealed that Steinhäuser had been doing research on the Internet into the Columbine High School massacre and had files relating to the crime saved on his computer.

Due to the regulations used in the State of Thuringia at the time, Steinhäuser, on expulsion, found himself with no qualifications at all and therefore had very limited job opportunities.

Massacre 

On the day of the shooting, before leaving his residence at his usual time, Steinhäuser armed himself with a 9mm Glock 17C, a Mossberg 590 Mariner 12-gauge pump-action shotgun, which was unusable due to an earlier handling error, and a diving knife. Steinhäuser probably entered the school unmasked at 10:45, carrying his weapons and ammunition in his sports bag or backpack at the time. As Steinhäuser is in the hallway, he encounters the building's caretaker, Herr Pfofenheuer, and briefly talks with him. He asks whether or not Frau Alt, the principal, was in the building. After this conversation, Steinhäuser goes into the men's toilet on the ground floor. He puts his backpack down in a stall and "gears up." He puts the shotgun across his back, his pistol with a 31-round magazine in a holster on his right leg, and takes 4 additional magazines for the Glock, and 10 shotgun shells. He also puts in earplugs and puts on a black balaclava-like mask in which only eyeholes are cut.

The shooting started shortly before 10:58 am. Steinhäuser then leaves the restroom, and the rest of his weaponry, and walks down the hallway to the administration area. He rings the doorbell and then waits. The door is unlocked by buzzer and Steinhäuser enters. He fires one round at the assistant principal, Frau Hajna, who is sitting at her desk, hitting her in the head, and killing her. He then turns to Frau Schwertner, the secretary, and shoots her twice, killing her as well. Steinhäuser exits the administration area and quickly goes up the stairs. When the headmistress went to check the noise, Steinhäuser had already left the room. Upon discovering the bodies, she locked herself in her office and alerted the emergency services.

As he comes up the stairs, he fatally shoots teacher Herr Schwarzer 3 times as he's unlocking the door to room 102. Steinhäuser then crosses the hallway and enters classroom 105. He shoots the teacher, Herr Wolff, twice in front of the class, killing him. As he leaves the classroom, Steinhäuser encounters another teacher, Herr Schwertfeger, who has left his class in order to investigate the noise. He fires 4 times and hits Schwertfeger with 3 shots, killing him. Steinhäuser leaves the second level and goes up the stairs again. He briefly looks into the first 2 classrooms on the right, sweeping the pistol back and forth as he does. He then travels farther down the hallway. As he does, Steinhäuser fires a shot towards a locker bay, hitting the farthest locker, but not injuring anybody. He enters the through-room, 204, which has just emptied out the opposite door. He points the gun at 2 students, then turns away and follows the teacher, Frau Klement, who has just exited the classroom. Steinhäuser crosses the classroom and exits out the other door. He immediately turns and fires at Frau Klement, shooting her 5 times, killing her. Steinhäuser goes farther down the hallway and enters classroom 211. As he does, he closes the hinged blackboard and kills Yvonne-Sofia Fulsche-Baer in front of her class. He crosses the hallway and looks into classroom 208. He doesn't recognize the teacher, possibly thinking that she's a student due to the students gathering around her desk, and he doesn't fire in this classroom. Steinhäuser also looks into the adjacent classroom, 207, and doesn't fire as well. Steinhäuser goes up the stairs to the fourth level. As he reaches the top, he enters the first classroom, 307. Steinhäuser crosses the room and fires 8 shots at the teacher, Frau Baumbach, killing her with 6 shots. He then turns and approaches the door to the room. There, he reloads his pistol, dropping the 31-round magazine, and inserts a 17-round one. Steinhäuser then looks into the adjacent classroom, 308. He passes by the teacher, who has left the classroom to investigate the noise, possibly because he doesn't recognize her. He travels farther down the hallway and enters the through-room, 304. He crosses the classroom and shoots the trainee-teacher, Frau Pott, 4 times in front of her class. Steinhäuser leaves the classroom and enters the other side of the hallway.  As he travels down the hallway, he encounters Frau Sicker, who had opened the door to investigate the noise as she monitored the Abitur exam. She is fatally shot once in the face as she turns away, and she collapses into room 303. Steinhäuser travels farther down the hallway to classroom 301. As he reaches the classroom, he pushes a student out of the doorway and shoots Herr Lippe 4 times. He will remain alive for over an hour before succumbing to his wounds. Steinhäuser descends the stairs to the third level. As he does, he's asked by a student: "Is it normal that I'm deaf now?" He nods, pats her on the back, and passes her by.  As he reaches the third floor, he fires twice at a teacher, Frau Burghardt, who is standing near the entrance to classroom 201. Both shots hit her, and she runs into the classroom. Steinhäuser stands in the entrance of the classroom and fires one shot, that hits Frau Burghardt as she runs away. She collapses in the doorway leading to room 202. He crosses the classroom and fires twice at Frau Burghardt, killing her. Steinhäuser then steps over her body and shoots her an additional time. He then leaves room 202 and re-enters the hallway before proceeding to room 204. While in room 204, Steinhäuser reloads his pistol again, inserting a 17-round magazine and ejecting a live round. He then leaves the classroom through the opposite door. When he enters the hallway, he heads to classroom 208, which has been locked, and unsuccessfully attempts to open it. Steinhäuser ejects a live round and fires 8 times at the door. The bullets pass through the door and hits students on the other side, killing Ronny Möckel with two shots, Susann Hartung with one, and injuring another student in the knee. Steinhäuser then leaves the third floor and goes down the stairs. He goes down the hallway and looks into classroom 108, which is empty. Steinhäuser then fires a shot through the door of the men's restroom. It strikes a backpack on the far left side, but doesn't injure anyone. He then looks into classroom 107, which is also empty. Steinhäuser then goes down the stairs and returns to the ground floor. He goes down the hallway and enters the stairwell to the yard. He descends it and exits the school building. When he exits, he starts to chase a nearby teacher, Dr. Dettke, who had helped in evacuating students. As Steinhäuser chases Dr. Dettke, he fires 2 shots, both of which strike parked cars. Dr. Dettke is then shot in the upper back, which causes her to collapse on the ground. While on the ground, she is shot an additional 4 times at close range, killing her. At 11:05 am, a janitor called the police. At 11:12 am, the first police car arrived at the school. As he notices a police car pull up onto the street, Steinhäuser fires a shot into the air before moving to behind a tree. He then reloads his pistol, inserting another 17-round magazine. Steinhäuser fires at the police car with 4 rounds before heading back into the school. PHM Engelhardt fires two shots towards him, but both miss. As he enters the school, he goes back up to the ground floor and proceeds down the hallway before going up the stairwell. On the landing between the ground and first floors, Steinhäuser approaches the window facing towards the police car he had seen. Two police officers, PHM Gorski and PHM Baldauf, are putting on ballistic vests and walking towards the yard. Steinhäuser shoots out the window at PHM Gorski, striking him in the neck before his ballistic vest is secured. He falls to the ground, his vest opening as he does, and is fatally shot an additional 3 times.

Steinhäuser goes up the stairs to the first floor. He goes down the hallway and enters room 104, which is being re-floored. He takes off his mask and briefly talks to the workers. Steinhäuser then puts on his mask again and leaves room 104, goes back down the hallway, and heads up the stairs to the third floor. He then crosses the entirety of the third floor before going back down the opposite stairwell to the second floor. As Steinhäuser goes down the hallway, a teacher, Herr Heise, opens the door to room 111. Steinhäuser points the gun at Herr Heise, then lowers it and says: "Herr Heise, für heute reicht's", which translates to: "Herr Heise, that's enough for today". Herr Heise then tries to persuade Steinhäuser to enter room 111 with him to talk. He opens the door wider and invites him in. Steinhäuser enters, and Herr Heise shoves him before shutting and locking the door. Herr Heise runs away from the room and towards the stairwell. Steinhäuser walks further into room 111. Steinhäuser then kills himself with a shot to the right temple.

From the first shot to Steinhäuser's suicide the spree lasted no more than 20 minutes. One and a half hours later, Steinhäuser's body was found by a special police detachment (SEK) in room 111. The gunman had killed 16 people in the massacre—The assistant principal, the secretary, ten teachers, one trainee-teacher, two students, and one police officer. 71 rounds were fired throughout the whole series of shootings.

Reactions 

Steinhäuser's family issued a statement to news sources saying that they "will forever be sorry that our son and brother has brought such horrifying suffering to the victims and their relatives, the people of Erfurt and Thuringia, and all over Germany."

In 2004, after repeated public criticisms of the police response to the shooting, the state government of Thuringia tasked a committee to release a final report on the incident. 

The state government of Thuringia reprimanded the principal of the school for the expulsion of Steinhäuser, saying she had overstepped her legal powers and violated the rules of the procedure. There were no further legal consequences for the principal and she remains in charge of the school as of 2017.  

Likewise, the Thuringian education law was caught in the crossfire of criticism. Since Steinhäuser was already an adult, the school administration was not required to inform his parents about their son's expulsion from school. In contrast to most other German states at this time, the state of Thuringia did not automatically award the middle school certificate at the end of the 10th grade of the Gymnasium. Students who did not pass the final exams therefore did not have a school certificate, which left them with limited job prospects. In response to the shooting, a law was enacted that would give high school students the option to take an exam at the end of year 10 at their own request. Since 2004, this exam has been mandatory for all Thuringian high school students.

The shooting also led to public discussions on the effect of violence in media and its effect on the youth, especially in relation to computer games of the first-person shooter genre, so-called killer games and dealing with fictional violence in other media. According to the report of the Gutenberg Commission, Steinhäuser had some violent movies such as Fight Club, Predator or Desperado, as well as the video games Return to Castle Wolfenstein, Hitman: Codename 47 and Half-Life. Steinhäuser was apparently not interested in the game Counter-Strike, which was often mentioned in connection with the shooting by the media. The discussions contributed to a revision of the Protection of Young Persons Act and helped to strengthen the rules for these areas.

In addition to the reform of the youth protection act, gun laws were tightened. The legal minimum age for those who wanted to join a shooting club was raised from 18 to 21 years and anyone under 25 years wishing to handle firearms was now required to undergo a medical-psychological examination. Pump action firearms were banned altogether. Furthermore, the retention requirements for firearms and ammunition were significantly tightened.

Legacy 

After the rampage, around 700 students were diagnosed with post-traumatic stress disorder, about one hundred of whom were still under treatment for one year later. 10 years after the killing spree, there were still 6 witnesses in psychological therapy, including 4 who had initially rejected a follow-up program. These adolescents had "time-delayed disturbances such as memory gaps and extreme avoidance behavior". The Thuringian accident insurance fund as payers has so far taken over childcare costs for the victims in the amount of about 5.6 million euros, including about 2.2 million euros as pension payments, for example, for survivors' pensions.

Steinhäuser's last words – Für heute reicht's ("that's enough for today") – was also the title of a controversial book about the massacre written by Ines Geipel, who alleged that there were several mistakes made by the police on the case. Geipel, and relatives of some of the victims, criticized police for the initial speed of their response. The police had initially believed there was a second gunman, leading them to retake the school one floor at a time rather than storm the entire building. Police laws and police training were reformed in most federal states in response to the shooting. While police patrols were previously required to wait for a special task force, policemen all over Germany now get the necessary training and equipment to deal directly with mass shooters.

Heise was hailed as a national hero for locking Steinhäuser in a room, which ended the killing spree, but was later subject to backlash from some members of the public due to questions about his role. Erfurt Mayor Manfred Ruge said he fully believes Heise, but acknowledged the teacher's rather direct and animated style combined with the vast media coverage had caused resentment in the town.

The massacre led to the development of a code word that could be broadcast over the public address system to warn teachers of a shooting. "Mrs Koma is coming", which is "amok" spelled backwards, was later used at the Winnenden school shooting to alert teachers to that attack.

Steinhauser was mentioned in a video created by Pekka-Eric Auvinen, who killed 8 people during the Jokela shooting in Finland.

See also 
 List of rampage killers (school massacres)
 Winnenden school shooting
 Emsdetten school shooting
 Ansbach school attack

References

External links 

2002 mass shootings in Europe
2002 suicides
2002 murders in Germany
2000s in Thuringia
April 2002 crimes
April 2002 events in Europe
Crime in Thuringia
Deaths by firearm in Germany
High school killings in Europe
High school shootings
School massacre
Mass murder in 2002
Mass shootings in Germany
Massacres in Germany
Murder–suicides in Germany
School killings in Germany
School massacres in Europe
School shootings in Germany
Spree shootings in Germany
Suicides by firearm in Germany
Columbine High School massacre copycat crimes
School shootings committed by pupils